Savannah station is an Amtrak train station in Savannah, Georgia. The station was built in 1962 to replace the older Savannah Union Station, torn down for construction of I-16. Located at 2611 Seaboard Coastline Drive, the station consists of a terminal building on the east side of the north-south tracks, with a platform between the tracks.

History
The station was constructed in 1962 by the Atlantic Coast Line Railroad, with funds channeled through the Georgia Ports Authority, to the City of Savannah, as part of the re-development requiring the removal of Savannah Union Station, to facilitate construction of Interstate 16 into the downtown area. The agreement provides for all tenant roads and/or successor carriers, use of the facility, in exchange for agreeing to the move. This would apply to carrier trains, like CSX inspection trains, occasional GrandLuxe tour trains, and even infrequent visits by the Sam Shortline Specials from Vidalia and Cordele.

Architecture
Savannah station is an example of Modernist architecture.  Unlike the Spanish-Renaissance and Elizabethan revival styles of the former Union Station, which reflect on past traditions, the current station's design conforms to the architectural traditions of its own time.  With the station being constructed during the height of racial segregation, there were two sets of restrooms - one for white and another for colored.  In 2014, the set of restrooms closest to the tracks were renovated to accommodate ADA requirements, but as of October 2015, they have not yet been opened for use.  The existing restrooms cannot accommodate wheelchairs.

Operation
Savannah is served by the trains of Amtrak's Silver Service, as well as infrequent passage/parking of a variety of inspection, business, and excursion tour specials, and the occasional private car charter.  It is the southern terminus of the Palmetto route and is along the Silver Star and Silver Meteor routes.  North of Savannah, the Palmetto and Silver Meteor route diverge from the Silver Star line. While the Silver Star turns inland to serve Columbia, South Carolina and Cary and Raleigh, North Carolina, the Palmetto and Silver Meteor stay closer to the coast to serve Florence and Charleston, South Carolina. The trains do not converge again until Selma, North Carolina.

Unlike Savannah Union Station, this station does not require back-up moves, saving some operational time at the expense of having fewer tracks accessible to passengers.

The terminal offers ticketing, checked baggage, Amtrak Express shipping, and shipping services. It also contains a pedestrian tunnel that's marked as a "subway."

See also
Central of Georgia Depot and Trainshed (Savannah, Georgia)
Savannah Union Station

References

External links

Savannah Amtrak Station (USA Rail Guide - TrainWeb)
Sam Shortline Special Trains
Antebellum South GrandLuxe Rail Journey 

Amtrak stations in Georgia (U.S. state)
Buildings and structures in Savannah, Georgia
Transportation in Savannah, Georgia
S
Railway stations in the United States opened in 1962
1962 establishments in Georgia (U.S. state)